İlona Zeynalova (born 09 January 2005) is an Azeri rhythmic gymnast. She represents her country at international competitions.

Career 
Zeynalova made her international debut when she was selected to participate in the 2020 European Championships in Kyiv along Narmin Bayramova, Leyli Aghazada, Alina Gozalova and the senior group, achieving the bronze medal in the team category.

In 2022 Zeynalova started to enter the spotlight, she started the season by participating at the World Cup in Tashkent ending 13th in the All-Around, 8th hoop, 13th with ball, 21st with clubs and 10th with ribbon. In May she won All-Around gold and hoop silver at the Irina Cup in Warsaw. In August 2022, Zeynalova competed in Cluj-Napoca World Cup 25th in the All-Around, 32nd hoop, 17th with ball, 21st with clubs and 29th with ribbon. In September she was a member of the team that represented Azerbaijan at the World Championships in Sofia along Zohra Aghamirova, Alina Gozalova and the senior group, she competed with clubs and ribbon finishing 32nd and 28th.

Routine music information

References 

2005 births
Living people
Azerbaijani rhythmic gymnasts
Medalists at the Rhythmic Gymnastics European Championships
21st-century Azerbaijani women